Ubiquitin conjugating enzyme E2 Q2 is a protein that in humans is encoded by the UBE2Q2 gene.

References

Further reading 

Human genes
Human proteins